Lieutenant-General John Conyers D'Arcy CBE MC (12 February 1894 – 1 February 1966) was a senior British Army officer who fought in both World War I and World War II, where he commanded the 9th Armoured Division.

Military career
Born the son of the Most Reverend Charles D'Arcy, D'Arcy was commissioned into the Royal Field Artillery in 1914. He fought in the First World War, where he was wounded twice during his service. While on leave he saw active service with the British Army during the Easter Rising, leading the attack on the General Post Office, Dublin. He was wounded on the North-West Frontier of India in 1931 and awarded the Military Cross.

He served again in the Second World War, commanded 9th Armoured Division in the UK from 1942 onwards. After the division was disbanded in 1944, he was promoted to the rank of Lieutenant-General and became General Officer Commanding British Forces in Palestine and Trans-Jordan from 1944. He retired in 1946.

He lived at Hyde Park in County Westmeath in Ireland.

Family
In 1920 he married Noël Patricia Wakefield; they had two sons.

References

Bibliography

External links
Generals of World War II

|-

1894 births
1966 deaths
Royal Artillery officers
British Army lieutenant generals
British Army generals of World War II
British Army personnel of World War I
British military personnel of the Palestine Emergency
Commanders of the Order of the British Empire
Companions of the Order of the Bath
Graduates of the Royal Military Academy, Woolwich
People of the Easter Rising
Recipients of the Military Cross
Royal Field Artillery officers